The 27th Golden Raspberry Awards, or Razzies, were held at the Ivar Theatre in Hollywood, California on February 24, 2007, to honor the worst films the film industry had to offer in 2006.

The nominations were announced on January 22, 2007. Basic Instinct 2 (which was dubbed by the ceremony as "Basically, It Stinks, Too") and Little Man received the most nominations with seven each.

As has been the tradition, the nominations were announced the day before the Academy Awards nominations, with the award show scheduled one day before to the Academy Awards ceremony.

In recent years, the organizers had added awards that were for a single year only. The Most Tiresome Tabloid Targets category from the previous year was replaced with Worst Excuse for Family Entertainment, which "salutes the dearth of quality G and PG-rated movie fare in 2006".

The category Worst Remake or Sequel was split into two separate categories: Worst Prequel or Sequel and Worst Remake or Rip-off.

For the first time, the awards program was broadcast over the Internet on MSNBC.com, via cell phone. In an experimental live webcast (referred to as "The Cell-E-Cast"), the show was shot on a series of cell phones and transmitted live by NBC Media Productions.

Winners and nominees

Films with multiple nominations 
These films received multiple nominations:

See also

 2006 in film
 79th Academy Awards
 60th British Academy Film Awards
 64th Golden Globe Awards
 13th Screen Actors Guild Awards

References

Golden Raspberry Awards
Golden Raspberry Awards ceremonies
2007 in American cinema
2007 in California
February 2007 events in the United States
Golden Raspberry